Dorobanțu is a commune in Tulcea County, Northern Dobruja, Romania. It is composed of five villages: Ardealu (depopulated as of 2002, historical name: Asînlar), Cârjelari, Dorobanțu, Fântâna Oilor (historical name: Coiumbunar or Coiumpunar) and Meșteru (historical name:Canat Calfa).

References

Communes in Tulcea County
Localities in Northern Dobruja